Wall Poems (alternatively Gedichten op muren or Dicht op de Muur) is a project in which more than 110  poems in many different languages were painted on the exterior walls of buildings in the city of Leiden, The Netherlands.

History and description
The Wall Poems project was partly funded by the private Tegen-Beeld foundation of Ben Walenkamp and Jan Willem Bruins, the project's two artists, with additional funding from several corporations and the city of Leiden. It began in 1992 with a poem in Russian by Marina Tsvetaeva and (temporarily) finished in 2005 with the Spanish poem De Profundis by Federico García Lorca. Other poets included in the set include E. E. Cummings, Langston Hughes, Jan Hanlo, Du Fu, Louis Oliver, Pablo Neruda, Rainer Maria Rilke, William Shakespeare, and W. B. Yeats, as well as local writers Piet Paaltjens and J. C. Bloem. One of the more obscure poems in the collection is written in the Buginese language on a canal wall near the Royal Netherlands Institute of Southeast Asian and Caribbean Studies; it and many of the other poems are accompanied by plaques with translations into Dutch and English.

Guides
A guide available on the web describes a walking tour for visitors to Leiden that takes in 25 of the 101 poems. The first 43 poems have been collected in a book by Marleen van der Weij, Dicht op de muur: gedichten in Leiden, and the rest are described in a second volume, published in 2005.

Gallery

Influence

Based on the success of the Leiden poetry project, wall poems have also been painted in several other Dutch cities. In 2004 the Dutch embassy to Bulgaria launched a similar project in Sofia, and in 2012 the Tegen-Beeld foundation collaborated with the International Society of Friends of Rimbaud to paint a poem by Arthur Rimbaud, "Le Bateau ivre", on a government building in the 6th arrondissement of Paris.
In 2012 a poem by Marsman was painted on a wall in Berlin.

Publications
 Marleen van der Weij: Dicht op de muur. Gedichten in Leiden. Gemeente Leiden, Dienst Bouwen en Wonen, 1996.  (2nd ed.: 1996, 3rd ed.: 1997). 6th, rev. ed.: Burgersdijk & Niermans, Leiden, 2000.  [Description of the first 43 poems].
 Marleen van der Weij: Dicht op de muur 2. Gedichten in Leiden. Burgersdijk & Niermans, Leiden, 2005.  [Description of the poems 44-101]

See also
 Poems on the Underground, a public display of poetry in the London Underground

References

External links

 Complete list of all poems, with some background information on the project and the poems

Buildings and structures in Leiden
Murals
Dutch poetry collections
1992 introductions